Events in the year 1992 in Mexico.

Incumbents

Federal government
 President: Carlos Salinas de Gortari
 Interior Secretary (SEGOB): Fernando Gutiérrez Barrios
 Secretary of Foreign Affairs (SRE): Fernando Solana Morales
 Communications Secretary (SCT): Andrés Caso Lombardo/Emilio Gamboa Patrón
 Secretary of Defense (SEDENA): Antonio Riviello Bazán
 Secretary of Navy: Luis Carlos Ruano Angulo
 Secretary of Labor and Social Welfare: Arsenio Farell Cubillas
 Secretary of Welfare: Patricio Chirinos Calero/Luis Donaldo Colosio
 Secretary of Public Education: Manuel Bartlett Díaz/Ernesto Zedillo Ponce de León
 Tourism Secretary (SECTUR): Silvia Hernández Enríquez
 Secretary of the Environment (SEMARNAT): Guillermo Jiménez Morales
 Secretary of Health (SALUD): Jesús Kumate Rodríguez

Supreme Court

 President of the Supreme Court:

Governors

 Aguascalientes
Miguel Ángel Barberena Vega, (Institutional Revolutionary Party, PRI), until November 30
Otto Granados Roldán, PRI, starting December 1.
 Baja California: Ernesto Ruffo Appel, (National Action Party PAN)
 Baja California Sur: Víctor Manuel Liceaga Ruibal
 Campeche: Abelardo Carrillo Zavala/Jorge Salomón Azar García
 Chiapas: Patrocinio González Garrido
 Chihuahua: Fernando Baeza Meléndez/Francisco Barrio 
 Coahuila: Eliseo Mendoza Berrueto
 Colima: Carlos de la Madrid Virgen
 Durango: José Ramírez Gamero/Maximiliano Silerio Esparza
 Guanajuato: Carlos Medina Plascencia
 Guerrero: José Francisco Ruiz Massieu (PRI)
 Hidalgo: Adolfo Lugo Verduzco
 Jalisco: Guillermo Cosío Vidaurri/Carlos Rivera Aceves (PRI)
 State of Mexico: Ignacio Pichardo Pagaza/Emilio Chuayffet (PRI)
 Michoacán: Genovevo Figueroa Zamudio/Eduardo Villaseñor Peña/Ausencio Chávez Hernández
 Morelos: Antonio Riva Palacio (PRI).
 Nayarit: Celso Humberto Delgado Ramírez
 Nuevo León: Sócrates Rizzo (PRI)
 Oaxaca: Diódoro Carrasco Altamirano (PRI)
 Puebla: Mariano Piña Olaya/Manuel Bartlett Díaz (PRI)
 Querétaro: Enrique Burgos García (PRI)
 Quintana Roo: Miguel Borge Martín (PRI)
 San Luis Potosí: Horacio Sánchez Unzueta (PRI)
 Sinaloa: Francisco Labastida/Renato Vega Alvarado (PRI)
 Sonora: Manlio Fabio Beltrones Rivera (PRI)
 Tabasco: Salvador Neme Castillo/Manuel Gurría Ordóñez (PRI)
 Tamaulipas: Américo Villarreal Guerra/Manuel Cavazos Lerma (PRI)	
 Tlaxcala: Samuel Quiróz de la Vega/José Antonio Álvarez Lima (PRD)
 Veracruz: Dante Delgado Rannauro/Patricio Chirinos Calero (PRD)
 Yucatán: Dulce María Sauri Riancho (PRI)
 Zacatecas: Pedro de Leon/Arturo Romo Gutiérrez (PRI)
Regent of Mexico City: Manuel Camacho Solís

Events
 January 16: Signing of the Chapultepec Peace Accords in Mexico City.
 April 22: 1992 Guadalajara explosions.
 July 8: The José Luis Cuevas Museum opens.

Awards
Belisario Domínguez Medal of Honor – Ramón G. Bonfil

Sport
 1991–92 Mexican Primera División season.
 1991–92 Copa México.
 1992 Caribbean Series played at the Héctor Espino Baseball Stadium in Hermosillo. 
 Tigres del México win the Mexican League.
 1992 Mexican Grand Prix.
 Mexico at the 1992 Winter Olympics.
 Mexico at the 1992 Summer Olympics.
 Mexico at the 1992 Summer Paralympics.
 Monterrey La Raza is founded.
 August 5: Tigrillos de Chetumal  are founded.

Births
February 2: David Sánchez (boxer) (d. 2017).
May 23: Ramiro Alejandro Celis, bullfighter (d. 2017).
 June 24: Germán Sánchez, diver.
July 8: Ariel Camacho, singer-songwriter (Los Plebes del Rancho de Ariel Camacho), (d. February 25, 2015).

Deaths
January 19: Augusto Benedico, Spanish-Mexican actor (Los ricos también lloran)
 February 5: Sergio Méndez Arceo, Roman Catholic bishop of Cuernavaca 1953-1983 (b. 1907)

References

 
Mexico